Jan Stæchmann (born 5 June 1966 in Kolding, Denmark) is a former professional motorcycle speedway rider and manager of the Danish national team.

Career
He led Denmark to the 2006 Speedway World Cup and 2008 Speedway World Cup, as well as the 2010 U21 Team World Championship.

Joined commercial rights holders BSI Speedway (IMG) on their media production team as broadcast co-commentator for 2011 and 2012. He had a short stint as team manager for Swindon Robins at end of 2011, and Peterborough Panthers 2012 until mid 2013.

Works freelance for Danish TV station TV3 Sport whom he joined in 2014, as broadcast commentator on Speedway Grand Prix and Speedway World Cup.

Member of FIM's Track Racing Bureau since 2013.

World Final Appearances
 1994 -  Vojens, Speedway Center - 10th - 7pts

Speedway Grand Prix results

See also
 Denmark national speedway team
 List of Speedway Grand Prix riders

References

1966 births
Living people
Danish speedway riders
Wolverhampton Wolves riders
Stoke Potters riders
Hull Vikings riders
Long Eaton Invaders riders
Oxford Cheetahs riders
People from Kolding
Sportspeople from the Region of Southern Denmark